Wilhelm Eichenberg (fl. 1930s) was a geologist and zoologist known for having described the class Conodonta of prehistoric jawless fish in 1930.

References 

 Eicheberg, W. 1931. Die Schichtenfolge des Herzberg-Andreasberger Sattelzuges. iNeues Jahrbuch für Mineralogie, Geologie und Paläontologie, Beilage-Band B 65i, 141-196. 
 Eichenberg, W. 1934. Die Erforschung der Mikroorganismen, insbesondere der Foraminiferen der norddeutschen Erdölfelder. Teil I. Foraminiferen der Unterkreide. 3. Folge. Foraminiferen aus dem Hauterive von Wenden am Mittellandkanal. Erscheinungsdatum 
 Eicheberg, W. (date unknown) Mikrofaunen-Tafeln zur Bestimmung von Unterkreide-Horizonten in Bohrkernen norddeutscher Ölfelder.

Conodont specialists